Team Knight Rider (TKR) is an American action crime drama television series that was adapted from the Knight Rider franchise and ran in syndication between 1997 and 1998. TKR was created by writer/producers Rick Copp and David A. Goodman, based on the original series created by Glen A. Larson, who was an executive producer. TKR was produced by Gil Wadsworth and Scott McAboy and was distributed by Universal Domestic Television and ran a single season of 22 one-hour episodes.

Plot
The story is about a new team of high-tech crime fighters assembled by the Foundation for Law and Government (FLAG, formed by Wilton Knight) who follow in the tracks of the legendary Michael Knight and his supercar KITT. Instead of "one man making a difference", there are now five team members who each have a computerized talking vehicle counterpart. Like the original duo, TKR goes after notorious criminals who operate "above the law" – from spies and assassins to terrorists and drug dealers. The final episode of the season, and series, featured the reappearance of Michael Knight (seen only from behind and played by a body double) at the very end, serving as a cliffhanger to the season which was never resolved due to the series being cancelled.

Cast

Team Knight Rider members
 Kyle Stewart, (played by Brixton Karnes), a former CIA agent and leader of TKR
 Jenny Andrews, (played by Christine Steel), a former Marine and Gulf War veteran. An episode of the series insinuates she may be the daughter of Michael Knight, however the question is never resolved.
 Duke DePalma, (played by Duane Davis), a former Chicago police officer and small-time boxer.
 Erica West, (played by Kathy Trageser), a former con artist and thief who was given a second chance to use her skills for law enforcement.
 Kevin "Trek" Sanders, (played by Nick Wechsler), a geeky yet handsome technical genius. His nickname was given to him by his parents, who are huge Star Trek fans.

Other FLAG members

 Gil, (played by Vince Waldron), one of the lead mechanics aboard Sky One.
 Clayton, (played by Rick Copp), the head chef aboard Sky One.
 Captain J.P. Wyatt, (played by Lowell Dean), the pilot of Sky One.
 Dr. Felson, (played by Steve Sheridan), the medical doctor aboard Sky One.
 Scott, (played by Michael Lexx), a mechanic aboard Sky One.
 Shadow, (played by Steve Forrest), a mysterious person who guides and feeds the team information throughout the season, eventually revealed to be a holographic projection controlled by K.I.T.T.

Other prominent characters

 Jim Marland is a character that replaced the original series' Devon Miles as leader of FLAG and was responsible for the design and construction of KRO (See other vehicles below). Later, Marland stepped down and Stewart was given both operational and field service control over TKR. His mindset since the KRO incident was "One man can be given too much power" and thus the 5 vehicles were created, each with their own weaknesses.
 Martin Jantzen, (played by Bill Bumiller), the criminally psychotic driver of K.R.O.
 Mobius, (voiced by David McCallum), the wheelchair and ventilator bound, criminal mastermind behind season 1's inter-episode subplot.
 Dennis, (played by Jim Fyfe), a mechanic aboard Sky One eventually revealed to be a mole paid off by Mobius to infect the cars with a computer virus.
 Liz "Starr" Starrowitz, (played by Rainer Grant ), a criminal who later reappears as the sidekick/lover of Mobius, and as a member of Mobius's "Legion of Doom".
 Max Amendes (listed as Max Amato in the credits of both episodes he appeared in and played by Jim Piddock), a criminal who later reappears as a member of Mobius's "Legion of Doom".
 Kayla Gordon, (played by Marta Martin), a criminal who later reappears as a member of Mobius's "Legion of Doom".
 Roland Laschewsky, (played by Roland Kickinger), Starr's bodyguard (and, therefore, Mobius' bodyguard as well).

Production

Team vehicles

Team Knight Rider use five different vehicles for their missions, each with its own computer AI system similar to the original Knight Industries 2000 vehicle. Unlike KITT, these are specialized units with specific roles in the team.  In addition, after the K.R.O. incident, Garland has had each vehicle installed with intentional weaknesses to act as a fail-safe in case any of them go rogue.

Although armored to protect their occupants, the vehicles do not share the original KITT's nearly indestructible "molecular bonded shell". Windows can be shattered by bullets or blown open with a small explosive, for example, while body panels can be damaged in collisions and roll-overs. The vehicles deploy their own self-repair system enabling the cars to fix their own minor damage – shattered windows and crushed body panels have been shown "fixed" soon after taking damage. More severe impacts however, require body shop maintenance to repair the vehicles.

Danté (DNT-1), (voiced by Tom Kane), is a modified Ford Expedition sport utility vehicle driven by Kyle. The truck has enough room to transport the entire TKR team and functions like a mobile command center. Danté's AI expresses himself in a haughty British manner and has no misgivings about making his driver and passengers feel uncomfortable. He is the de facto leader of the vehicles (if they'd ever listen to him) and he usually speaks on their behalf.
Domino (DMO-1), (voiced by Nia Vardalos), is a modified Ford Mustang convertible driven by Jenny. The AI's manner is sleek, sexy and flirtatious. She is also talkative and likes to gossip to the annoyance of the other TKR vehicles.
Attack Beast (BST-1), (voiced by Kerrigan Mahan), is a modified Ford F-150 full-sized pickup truck with off-road capability, driven by Duke. Beast's AI has a stubborn and argumentative attitude that talks tough and is not afraid to stand up to a fight.  Much to Duke's embarrassment, Beast also has a fondness for the music of Alanis Morissette. His favorite tactic is to crash through walls and surprise the enemy. Beast does not like to take orders from Duke or anyone else, but he is fiercely loyal and gets the job done. TKR member Jenny is the only one Beast will listen to, and his aggressive nature softens when she is around.
Kat (KAT-1), (voiced by Andrea Beutner), is a high-tech motorcycle that merges with her twin, Plato, to form the advanced High Speed Pursuit Vehicle, capable of high speeds and incredible maneuverability. Kat is driven by Erica and her AI has a polar opposite personality to that of her driver. Kat is always concerned with rules and regulations and is in constant conflict with Erica's amoral traits. She acts more like Erica's mother than her partner, but she will do whatever is necessary to get Erica out of a jam.
Plato (PLATO-1), (voiced by comedian John Kassir), is the other motorcycle that merges with his twin Kat to form the High Speed Pursuit Vehicle. Plato is driven by Trek and, like his operator, Plato is a nerdy brainiac completely consumed by facts, figures and data. Plato likes to quote television commercials and famous movie lines and talks in sort of a code that only Trek can understand. The two have developed a strange symbiotic relationship that the other TKR members can never figure out.

Other vehicles

Sky One (SKY-1), (voiced by Linda M. McCollough), is a massive C5 military cargo airplane with special VTOL capability. Sky One acted as TKR's mobile base and vehicle transport, and carries a crew of 65, including the TKR field operatives, the flight crew,  maintenance crew, mechanics, fire crew, kitchen staff, and medical staff.
K.R.O., (pronounced Crow, an acronym for Knight Reformulation One) was supposed to have been the replacement for KITT. KRO is a modified black Ferrari F355 with a highly unstable AI similar to KARR. After events that led to his murdering of five people, KRO was deactivated. KRO's operator, Martin Jantzen, was equally unstable. KRO later escapes to kill his creator and FLAG is forced to destroy him. KRO was voiced by John B. Wells.
K.A., short for Knight Alpha, a prototype vehicle introduced in "Legion of Doom" for a possible European Knight Rider team being prepared for delivery to Berlin. KA is a European-made Ford Ka compact hatchback. KA is capable of many languages, but refuses to speak English, preferring German.

Episodes

See also

 Knight Rider franchise

References

External links
 
Team Knight Rider.com- Comprehensive website about the series
Team Knight Rider fansite

1997 American television series debuts
1998 American television series endings
American action television series
English-language television shows
NBC original programming
Knight Rider television series
Television series about robots
American sequel television series
Television series by Universal Television